Sloughing may refer to:

Sloughing, in biology,  shedding or casting off dead tissue
Skin sloughing, shedding dead surface cells off the skin
Soil sloughing, a type of soil behavior
 Sloughing (biofilms), shedding of the biofilm in certain wastewater treatment units, particularly trickling filters and rotating biological contactors.

See also 
Slough (disambiguation)